In mathematics, a grope is a construction used in 4-dimensional topology, introduced by  and named by  "because of its multitudinous fingers".

A capped surface in a 4-manifold is roughly a surface together with some 2-disks, called caps, whose boundaries generate the fundamental group of the surface. A capped grope is obtained by repeatedly replacing the caps of a capped surface by another capped surface.

References

4-manifolds